The Guardianes 2020 Liga MX Final is set to be the two-legged final that will determine the winner of the Liga MX Guardianes 2020, the 103rd edition of the Liga MX final, the top-flight football league in Mexico.

The final will be contested in two-legged home-and-away format between León and UNAM. The first leg will be hosted by UNAM at Estadio Olímpico Universitario inside Ciudad Universitaria in Mexico City on December 10, 2020, while the second leg will be hosted by León at Estadio León in León on December 13, 2020.

Both finalists qualified to the 2022 CONCACAF Champions League.

Background
First time both clubs meet each other in a league final.

Before reaching this final, Leon appeared in three finals since being promoted to Liga MX in 2012, two in which they were victorious (Apertura 2013, Clausura 2014). The club last won the league title six years earlier when they defeated Pachuca to capture the Clausura 2014 title.

This was UNAM's first final since the team lost the Apertura 2015 Final. The team last won the league title 9 years earlier when they defeated Morelia to capture the Clausura 2011 title.

Format
The final will be played on a home-and-away two-legged basis, with the higher-seeded team hosting the second leg. If tied on aggregate, the away goals rule would not be used, and 30 minutes of extra time would be played. If still tied after extra time, the penalty shoot-out would be used to determine the winner.

Road to the finals

Note: In all results below, the score of the finalist is given first (H: home; A: away).

Matches

First leg

Second leg
Leon will host the second leg at the Estadio León.

Notes

References

2020–21 Liga MX season
1
Liga MX seasons